Reyes (Spanish, 'kings') may refer to:

Reyes (name), including a list of people and fictional characters
 Reyes, Bolivia, city capital of the José Ballivián Province in the Beni Department 
 Reyes rendering, a computer software architecture 
 Point Reyes, a prominent cape on the Pacific coast of northern California, U.S.
 Reyes, a name for Epiphany (holiday)
 Reyes Holdings, an American food manufacturer

Other uses

See also
 De los Reyes (disambiguation)
 Reye syndrome, a brain disease